John Murdoch (9 October 1796 – 15 December 1865) was a Roman Catholic bishop who served as the Vicar Apostolic of the Western District of Scotland.

Born in Wellheads, Enzie, Banffshire in 1796, he was ordained a priest on 19 March 1821. In March 1833, he was appointed Coadjutor Bishop of Kingston, Ontario but this did not take effect. He was appointed the Coadjutor Vicar Apostolic of the Western District and Titular Bishop of Castabala by the Holy See on 4 June 1833. He was consecrated to the Episcopate at St Andrew's Cathedral, Glasgow on 20 October 1833. The principal consecrator was Bishop James Kyle, and the principal co-consecrators were Bishop Andrew Scott and Bishop Andrew Carruthers. On the retirement of Bishop Andrew Scott on 15 October 1845, Bishop Murdoch automatically succeeded as the Vicar Apostolic of the Western District.

He died in office on 15 December 1865, aged 69.

References 

1796 births
1865 deaths
Apostolic vicars of Scotland
19th-century Roman Catholic bishops in Scotland
People from Banffshire
Place of death missing
Roman Catholic bishops of Kingston, Canada
Scottish Roman Catholic bishops